Collector's Series is a compilation album by American country duo The Judds. It was released on August 21, 1990 via Curb Records and RCA Nashville. It was produced by Brent Maher and consisted of eight tracks of previously-recorded material. The album was part of RCA's "Collector's Series" compilations, which had also been released by several artists.

Background, release and reception
Collector's Series contained eight tracks of material that had previously been released on The Judds's studio albums. The sessions were produced by Brent Maher, who had worked with the duo during their time at RCA and Curb Records. Music on the album dated as far back as 1984's extended play, Wynonna & Naomi. Three of the album's tracks were previously singles that had been major hits: "Love Is Alive," "Have Mercy" and "Cry Myself to Sleep." The fourth track, "Water of Love," had been released as a single internationally but did not chart. The remaining tracks were album cuts from the duo's previously-released albums. However, the tenth track had not been released on a studio effort until the release of this compilation.

Collector's Series was released on August 21, 1990 in Canada only. It had been issued there as a compact disc. The album was not released in the United States until February 23, 1993 and was issued as a compact disc and cassette. The album did not reach any peak positions on national publication charts, notably Billboard. It also did not spawn any singles to radio. In later years, the album received a rating from Allmusic, which gave it three out of five stars. In June 1993, Collector's Series was certified gold in sales from the Recording Industry Association of America, becoming their third compilation to receive an RIAA certification.

Track listing

CD versions

Cassette version

Personnel
All credits are adapted from the liner notes of Collector's Series.

Musical and technical personnel
 The Judds – lead vocals, harmony vocals
 Brent Maher – producer

Certifications

Release history

References

1990 compilation albums
Curb Records compilation albums
The Judds compilation albums
RCA Records compilation albums